The Evening Labyrinth was a 1980 Soviet comedy film directed by Boris Bushmelev.

Plot 
The film tells about a creative team that decides to open an attraction in one of the regional cities and sends a few employees there to find out how best to do it. Arriving there, they settle in a hotel and face a lot of problems.

Cast 
 Vladimir Basov		
 Viktor Ilichyov as Alekseyev
 Tatyana Vasileva as Eleonora
 Aleksandr Lazarev
 Valentina Talyzina
 Nikolay Parfyonov as Cloakroom attendant
 Tatyana Novitskaya
 Aleksandr Pashutin
 Georgiy Svetlani
 Mikhail Kokshenov

References

External links 
 

1980 films
1980s Russian-language films
Soviet comedy films
1980 comedy films